Edward Liddle (27 May 1878 – 22 November 1968) (sometimes Liddell) was an English football player, manager and scout. He played in the Football League for Gainsborough Trinity, Clapton Orient, with whom he spent the majority of his playing career, and Arsenal, and spent time with a number of other clubs at varying levels. Liddle went on to manage four teamsSouthend United, Queens Park Rangers, Fulham and Luton Townin league football.

Playing career
Liddle was born in Sunderland and during his playing career, he played as a wing half for a number of clubs. He started off with East End Black Watch in 1901 before moving to Whitburn (Durham) in 1903 and then Seaham White Star. After this he went on to play for Sunderland, Southampton, Gainsborough Trinity and Southend. In between he had his most successful spell as a player, at Clapton Orient, for whom he made over 200 appearances.

He ended his league career at Arsenal, joining the club in 1914. He played two league games in 1914–15, his debut coming against Hull City on 2 April 1915; he continued to play for the club during the First World War and was a member of Arsenal's reserve team until his retirement in the 1920 close season.

Managerial career
In 1920 he was appointed manager of Southend and, although his tenure only lasted a year, he oversaw their rise into the football league. In 1920 he moved to Queens Park Rangers where he was manager for four years before returning to Southend as assistant manager. His next role was as chief scout for Fulham and he subsequently went on to become their third manager in five years when he took up the post in 1929, taking over from the same person as he had at Southend, Joe Bradshaw. He finished his managerial career at Luton Town between 1936 and 1938. He continued to scout for other clubs, including Brentford, up until his death at the age of 90.

External links

References

1878 births
1969 deaths
Footballers from Sunderland
Association football wing halves
English footballers
Arsenal F.C. players
Gainsborough Trinity F.C. players
Leyton Orient F.C. players
Seaham Harbour F.C. players
Southampton F.C. players
Southend United F.C. players
Sunderland A.F.C. players
Southern Football League players
English Football League players
English football managers
Fulham F.C. managers
Luton Town F.C. managers
Southend United F.C. managers
Queens Park Rangers F.C. managers
English Football League managers
Brentford F.C. non-playing staff